Mountain Sport is the newest sport in Kenya. It is a combination of mountain-related sports, including  running, High Ropes Course, mountain climbing, and Abseiling, all done in the Jungle. The Mt. Kenya School of Adventure and Leadership (KESAL) held the inaugural Mountain Sports on October 22, 2011. KESAL is located on Mount Kenya, the second-highest mountain in Africa. KESAL is the only adventure school in Kenya located at the highest altitude. The Mountain Challenge includes both the team and individuals events such as the Sky Marathon (a Marathon race from 8000 ft to 15000 ft altitude) and the Jungle Race (a 21 km race in the woods around the mountain). The team Extreme Adventure incorporates various high-ropes stunts. Lastly, athletes compete in rock climbing and abseiling challenge. Winners for the inaugural event were Benard Waweru - Men’s 21 km Senior Jungle Race while the Senior Women’s 21 km was won by the elite road runner Pauline Wangui. Sammy Ndungu won the sky Marathon in the time of 6 hours, and The Kenya Methodist University (KEMU) won the Extreme Adventure title. The organizers limit the number of participants to minimize environmental impact.

References

Sport in Kenya by sport